Over the Top is a 1987 American sports drama film starring Sylvester Stallone. It was produced and directed by Menahem Golan, and its screenplay was written by Stirling Silliphant and Stallone. The original music score was composed by Giorgio Moroder. The main character, Lincoln Hawk/Hawks, played by Stallone, is a long-haul truck driver who tries to win back his estranged son, Michael, while becoming a champion arm wrestler.

Plot
Lincoln Hawk is a truck driver who also arm wrestles for extra cash. Hawk's estranged wife Christina, who is suffering from heart disease, asks that Hawk pick up their young son Michael from military school and develop a relationship with him; Hawk had left them ten years earlier. Michael's wealthy grandfather, Christina's father, Jason Cutler, believes that Hawk has no right to be in his grandson's life. Michael distrusts Hawk initially and treats him with contempt at every turn.

Over the course of a trip from Colorado to California, the two reconcile and bond. When they finally arrive at the hospital, Christina has died from complications during surgery. Michael blames Hawk for delaying his arrival and immediately leaves for his grandfather's estate. An attempt to retrieve Michael ends with Hawk being arrested when he resorts to ramraiding the gated mansion. Michael visits Hawk in jail and forgives him, but says he feels safer living with his grandfather. As a condition of charges being dropped, Hawk is obliged to sign over custody of Michael to Cutler.

Hawk leaves to compete in the World Armwrestling Championship in Las Vegas, hoping to start his own trucking company with the prize of $100,000 in cash and a $250,000 Volvo White Tractor Truck, despite his underdog status. Most other participants are much larger, including Bull Hurley, the undefeated world champion for the past five years and the odds-on favorite to win again. Other competitors include John Grizzly, Mad Dog Madison, Harry Bosco and Two-Time Canadian Champion "Slammin'" Carl Adams. When Hawk arrives, he sells his truck for $7,000 and uses the proceeds to place a bet on himself (as a 20–1 long shot) to win. Meanwhile, Michael learns Cutler had driven his parents apart and had been intercepting and hiding letters Hawk had regularly written to him. Stunned by his grandfather's deceptions, Michael steals a pickup truck and drives to Las Vegas to find Hawk.

Hawk advances to the final eight competitors in the double-elimination tournament before suffering his first loss, injuring his arm in the process. Cutler, who is also in Las Vegas, summons Hawk to his hotel suite and offers Hawk a chance for a fresh start: $500,000 and a top-of-the-line semi (even better than the tournament's grand prize) on the condition that he stay out of their lives for good, but Hawk refuses. He returns to the tournament with improved focus and advances to the final match against Hurley. Michael finds Hawk and apologizes for misjudging him, which gives Hawk the emotional support he needs to compete. After a long match, Hawk manages to beat Hurley and wins the tournament. A triumphant Hawk and Michael take their accumulated winnings and drive off in the new truck to start a new life together.

Cast

 Sylvester Stallone as Lincoln "Linc" Hawk
 Robert Loggia as Jason Cutler
 Susan Blakely as Christina Hawk
 Rick Zumwalt as Bob "Bull" Hurley
 David Mendenhall as Michael "Mike" Hawk 
 Chris McCarty as Tim Salanger
 Terry Funk as Ruker
 Bruce Way as John Grizzly
 Jimmy Keegan as Richie
 Greg "Magic" Schwartz as Smasher
 Allan Graf as Collins
 John Braden as Col. Davis
 Reggie Bennett as Female Arm Wrestler

Multi-time world arm wrestling champion and future professional wrestler Scott Norton also makes an appearance along with other professional arm wrestlers such as Allen Fisher, John Vreeland, Cleve Dean and Andrew "Cobra" Rhodes (as the final match referee). Professional arm wrestler John Brzenk also makes an appearance.

Production

Development and writing
In May 1984, it was reported Stallone would appear in the film for a fee of $12 million. Cannon Films presold the movie over the next few years during which time Stallone appeared in Rhinestone, Rambo: First Blood Part II and Rocky IV.

Cannon hired Stirling Silliphant to write the script. "It's an action love story with the emphasis on action," Silliphant says. "It's the story of a man trying to win back the love of his son and win the world arm-wrestling championship in Las Vegas." Although Stallone was a writer and had final cut on the film, Sillphant said "I don't anticipate any problem whatsoever. I'm a very difficult person to abuse...He doesn't have to do anything at this point. He has been very smart about what he can do. He has to protect that."

Filming
The film was shot for about 9 weeks from June 9 to August 15, 1986. The military academy scenes, portrayed as being in Colorado, were filmed at Pomona College in Claremont, California in 1986. The Kirkeby mansion at 750 Bel Air Road, Los Angeles (also the home of the Clampett family on the CBS comedy The Beverly Hillbillies) was used to portray the Cutler estate. Parts of the film were also shot in Monument Valley, Utah. Olive View–UCLA Medical Center was also used as the hospital.

Music

In late 1986, producer/director Menahem Golan chose prestigious Italian composer and record producer Giorgio Moroder as music supervisor of the soundtrack. Moroder was in charge of creating a concept album with a compilation of new songs in different genres and diverse artists, writing most tracks on the album himself in collaboration with Tom Whitlock.

The soundtrack album was released on February 13, 1987, under CBS to coincide with the release of the movie. It contains music from Frank Stallone, Kenny Loggins (who performs the film's central theme, "Meet Me Half Way"), Eddie Money, and Sammy Hagar. John Wetton, lead singer of the rock group Asia, sang "Winner Takes It All" for the movie, but after performing the song, it was felt that his voice wasn't "mean" enough, so the song was offered to Hagar, whose version, featuring a bass guitar solo from Hagar's then-bandmate Edward Van Halen, ended up being the one on the soundtrack. Asia is credited for the track "Gypsy Soul", but Wetton is the only Asia member who actually contributed to the song.

The track listing is:
 "Winner Takes It All" – Sammy Hagar
 "In This Country" – Robin Zander (international versions of the film had Eddie Money singing instead)
 "Take It Higher" – Larry Greene
 "All I Need Is You" – Big Trouble
 "Bad Nite" – Frank Stallone
 "Meet Me Half Way" – Kenny Loggins
 "Gypsy Soul" – Asia
 "The Fight (Instrumental)" – Giorgio Moroder
 "Mind Over Matter" – Larry Greene
 "I Will Be Strong" – Eddie Money

Stallone appears in the video for "Winner Takes It All," wrestling Hagar at the end of the video. Hagar says in his video commentary on the DVD The Long Road to Cabo that he was unenthusiastic about the song. Hagar says that Stallone gave him his black cap at the end of the shoot, both signed it, and the cap went to charity, fetching around $10,000.

Reception

Box office

Over the Top was released by Warner Bros. on Thursday, February 12, 1987, in New York and Los Angeles before expanding to 1,758 theaters on Friday, grossing $5.1 million over the President's Day weekend, finishing in fourth place. In total, the film earned $11.5 million in the US and Canada.

Critical response
On Rotten Tomatoes, the film has an approval rating of 32% based on 31 reviews, with an average rating of 4.7/10. The site's consensus states: "The definitive film about arm-wrestling truck drivers fighting for custody of their children, Over the Top lives down to its title in the cheesiest of ways." On Metacritic, it has a score of 40 out of 100 based on reviews from 12 critics, indicating "mixed or average reviews". Audiences polled by CinemaScore gave the film an average grade of "B+" on an A+ to F scale.

Variety called it "routinely made in every respect". Janet Maslin of The New York Times called it "muddled" and criticized the number of product placements. Rita Kempley of The Washington Post wrote that the film does not live up to Stallone's Rocky films and is "virtually a feature-length video" because of all the rock songs.

Movie historian Leonard Maltin seemed to agree: "Title merely begins to describe this heavy-handed variation on The Champ...In trying to underplay, Stallone speaks so quietly that you often can't make out what he's saying."

The film received three nominations at the 8th Golden Raspberry Awards in 1988. David Mendenhall won two for both Worst Supporting Actor and Worst New Star, and Sylvester Stallone was nominated for Worst Actor, which he lost to Bill Cosby for Leonard Part 6.

Stallone later said of the film, "I would have made it less glossy and set it more in an urban environment, for one. Next, I would've not used a never-ending stream of rock songs, but scored music instead, and most likely would've made the event in Vegas more ominous – not so carnival-like."

Other media

Novelization
A novelization based on the film titled Over the Top, was released.

See also
 List of films set in Las Vegas

References

External links
 
 
 
 

1987 films
1980s chase films
1980s drama road movies
1980s sports drama films
1987 drama films
American drama road movies
American sports drama films
1980s English-language films
Arm wrestling
American chase films
Trucker films
Golan-Globus films
Warner Bros. films
Films scored by Giorgio Moroder
Films directed by Menahem Golan
Films set in the Las Vegas Valley
Films shot in Utah
Films shot in Nevada
Films shot in California
Films with screenplays by Sylvester Stallone
Films with screenplays by Stirling Silliphant
Films about father–son relationships
Films produced by Menahem Golan
Golden Raspberry Award winning films
Films produced by Yoram Globus
1980s American films
Films shot in Monument Valley